The following lists events that happened during 1833 in Chile.

Incumbents
President of Chile: José Joaquín Prieto

Events

May
25 May - The Chilean Constitution of 1833 is promulgated.

Births
10 October - Melchor de Concha y Toro (d. 1892)
27 December - José Velásquez Bórquez (d. 1897)

Full date unknown
José del Carmen Quesada del Río (d. 1885), lawyer and magistrate

Deaths
23 July - Anselmo de la Cruz

References 

 
1830s in Chile
Chile
Chile